Mister India is a national pageant that selects India's representatives to international beauty pageants. Several national pageants are held each year and every two years. The chosen winner, or runner-ups, too is sent to compete in international pageants.

Mister India, which is run by the Miss India Organization, and the Rubaru Mister India competition are two of the major national pageants held. Winners and runner-ups from these pageants are sent to represent India at Mister World, Mister Supranational, Mister International, Mister Global, Manhunt International and other minor pageants.

From 1994 to 2012, Grasim Industries and later Haywards organised the annual Mister India competition, which selected India's representative to Mister World.

Jitesh Singh Deo of Lucknow is the reigning "Mister World India". On December 14, 2017, he was crowned in Mumbai. Because of the COVID-19 pandemic, he is expected to represent India at "Mister World 2023," as there was no Mister World pageant in 2021 and 2022. Abhi Khajuria and Pavan Rao were named Mr. India 2017's first and second runners-up, respectively.

History
Adonis-Graviera Contest was held in 1994 to select India's representative to the very first edition of Mister World in 1996. Bikram Saluja won the Adonis-Graviera Contest and represented India at the very first edition of Mister World held in Istanbul, Turkey in 1996. Tom Nuyens won the contest and Bikram finished in top 10. In the same year (1994) Gladrags Manhunt Contest was held in India to represent India at Manhunt International for the very first time. Rajat Bedi won this contest and participated in Manhunt International in 1994. He was subsequently placed as 4th Runner Up in the finale. The second edition of Mister India World was again organised by Graviera. Sachin Khurana from New Delhi won the contest and represented India at Mister World 1998.

Grasim Industries organized the annual pageant franchise from 1994 to 2007 and again from 2010 to 2012 that selected India's representative to Mister World. In 2007, Haywards 5000 took over the franchise for Mister World and organised Haywards 5000 Mr India World 2007 that selected Kawaljit Anand Singh as India's representative at Mister World 2007. However Grasim retook the ownership of franchise in 2010.

In 2014, The Times Group acquired the rights to send India's representatives to the Mister World pageant.

The Pageant
The event is held in Mumbai annually. 16 contestants from across India are selected for the annual pageant. Among them one is crowned Mr India who will represent India to the biennial international Mister World and one is crowned Mister Supranational India who will represent India at the annual Mister Supranational held in Poland.

Mister India titleholders

Representatives to major beauty pageants
Color key

Mister World
Earlier Mister India held the franchise of Mister World in India. The Times Group got the franchise in 2014.

Mister Supranational

Mister International

Manhunt International
Representatives to Manhut International is being sent by Gladrags organisation through Gladrags Manhunt and Megamodel Contest.

  No pageant held in these years: 2015, 2014, 2013, 2009, 2004, 2003 and 1996.

Mister Global

Man of the World

Representatives to minor beauty pageants

Mister Universal Ambassador

Mister United Continents

Mister Model of the World

Mister Model International

Mister National Universe

Mister Model Worldwide

Mister Tourism World

Mister Grand International (Based in Brazil)

Mr. Grand International (Based in Philippines)

Mister Grand International (Based in Myanmar)

Man of the Universe

Men Universe Model

Mister Gay World

See also
 Grasim Mr. India
 Mr. Gay India
 Femina Miss India

References

External links
 Mister World India Official Website
 Mr World - India
 Mister World India Official Facebook

Beauty pageants in India
2014 establishments in Maharashtra
India
Indian awards
India
India
India